Kip Alan Corrington (born April 12, 1965) is a former American football player. After playing college football at Texas A&M University, he spent two seasons in the NFL with the Denver Broncos. Corrington was a three-time Academic All-American as well as a two-time all-SWC safety in college. He is currently a family practitioner in the Greensboro, North Carolina area.

Notes

References

Living people
1965 births
Sportspeople from Ames, Iowa
Players of American football from Iowa
American football safeties
Denver Broncos players
Texas A&M Aggies football players